The 19th National Congress of the People's Party, officially the 19th Extraordinary National Congress, was held in Madrid from 20 to 21 July 2018, to renovate the governing bodies of the People's Party (PP) and establish the party's main lines of action and strategy for the next leadership term. A primary election to elect the new party president was held on 5 July. The congress was called by the party's National Board of Directors on 11 June as a consequence of former Spanish prime minister Mariano Rajoy's resignation as PP leader on 5 June, following the motion of no confidence that had voted his government down on 1 June. The leadership election was the first whereby PP members directly participate in choosing a leader for the party. On 26 June 2018, it was announced that only 66,706 PP members out of the 869,535 reported by the party had registered to vote in the election.

Former deputy prime minister Soraya Sáenz de Santamaría and the party's vice secretary-general of Communication Pablo Casado topped the poll in the primary election held on 5 July 2018, becoming eligible for the run-off to be held among party's delegates on 20−21 July. After preliminary data was published, Sáenz de Santamaría conceded the election and acknowledged Casado's victory. Casado's win, which was considered a party swing towards the right, was possible through the support to his candidacy of former party secretary-general María Dolores de Cospedal, who had been a bitter rival of Santamaría during the PP's time in government.

Overview
The congress of the PP was the party's supreme body, and could be of either ordinary or extraordinary nature, depending on whether it was held following the natural end of its term or due to any other exceptional circumstances not linked to this event. Ordinary congresses were to be held every four years and called at least two months in advance of their celebration, though this timetable could be altered for up to twelve months in the event of coincidence with electoral processes. Extraordinary congresses had to be called by a two-thirds majority of the Board of Directors at least one-and-a-half month in advance of their celebration, though in cases of "exceptional urgency" this deadline could be reduced to thirty days.

The president of the PP was the party's head and the person holding the party's political and legal representation, and presided over its board of directors and executive committee, which were the party's maximum directive, governing and administration bodies between congresses.

Electoral system
The election of the PP president was based on a two-round system, introduced in the party statutes during the previous PP congress in 2017. Any party member with at least one-year membership was eligible for the post of party president, on the condition that they were up to date with the payment of party fees and that they were able to secure the signed endorsements of at least 100 party members. The election was to be held in the party's 60 constituencies, corresponding to each province and island of Spain.

In the first round, all registered party members who had their payment fees up to date were allowed to vote for any of the candidates who had been officially proclaimed by virtue of securing the required number of signatures to run. In the event that no candidate won the first round outright—which required securing at least 50 percent of the national vote, being the most voted candidate in at least half of the constituencies and at least a 15-percentage point advantage over the runner-up—a second round would be held concurrently with the party congress, in which party delegates would elect the new party leader from among the two candidates who had previously received the most votes in the first round. Most of the delegates were to be elected by party members concurrently with the first round of voting to the party leadership.

Timetable
The key dates are listed below (all times are CEST. Note that the Canary Islands use WEST (UTC+1) instead):

11 June: Official announcement of the congress. Start of application period for party members to register in order to participate in the leadership election.
18 June: Start of candidate submission period at 12 pm.
20 June: End of candidate submission period at 2 pm.
22 June: Proclamation of candidates to the party presidency.
23 June: Official start of internal electoral campaigning (at 10 am).
25 June: Deadline for party members to register for voting at 2 pm.
29 June: Deadline for party members to apply as delegates at 2 pm.
4 July: Last day of internal electoral campaigning.
5 July: Primary election (first round of voting, with all registered party members entitled to vote for the proclaimed candidates) and election of congress delegates.
20−21 July: Party congress (if needed, a run-off voting was to be held among delegates to elect the party leader among the two most voted candidates in the first round).

Candidates

Declined
The individuals in this section were the subject of speculation about their possible candidacy, but publicly denied or recanted interest in running:

Alfonso Alonso (age ) — Deputy in the Basque Parliament for Álava (since 2016); President of the PP of the Basque Country (since 2015); Minister of Health, Social Services and Equality (2014–2016); Deputy in the Cortes Generales for Álava (2000–2002 and 2008–2016); Spokesperson of the PP Group in the Congress of Deputies (2011–2014); City Councillor of Vitoria (1996–2008); Mayor of Vitoria (1999–2007).
 José Ramón Bauzá (age ) — Senator in the Cortes Generales appointed by the Parliament of the Balearic Islands (since 2015); Deputy in the Parliament of the Balearic Islands for Mallorca (2011–2015); President of the Balearic Islands (2011–2015); President of the PP of the Balearic Islands (2009–2015); Mayor of Marratxí (2005–2011); City Councillor of Marratxí (1999–2011); Vice President of the PP of the Balearic Islands (2007–2009); Deputy Mayor for Urbanism and Health of Marratxí (2003–2005).
Cristina Cifuentes (age ) — President of the PP of the Community of Madrid (2017–2018); President of the Community of Madrid (2015–2018); Deputy in the Assembly of Madrid (1991–2012 and 2015–2018); President of the PP Group in the Assembly of Madrid (2015); Government's Delegate in Madrid (2012–2015); First Vice President of the Assembly of Madrid (2005–2012); First Secretary of the Assembly of Madrid (1999–2003).
Íñigo de la Serna (age ) — Minister of Development of Spain (2016–2018); Deputy in the Parliament of Cantabria (2015–2016); President of the Council of European Municipalities and Regions (2015–2016); Mayor of Santander (2007–2016); City Councillor of Santander (2003–2016); President of the Spanish Federation of Municipalities and Provinces (2012–2015).
Alberto Núñez Feijóo (age ) — President of the Xunta de Galicia (since 2009); President of the PP of Galicia (since 2006); Deputy in the Parliament of Galicia for Pontevedra (since 2005); First Vice President of the Xunta de Galicia (2004–2005); Minister of Territorial Policy, Public Works and Housing of Galicia (2003–2005); President of the State Society of Mail and Telegraphs (2000–2003); Secretary-General for Healthcare (1996–2000).
Ana Pastor (age ) — President of the Congress of Deputies (since 2016); Deputy in the Cortes Generales for Pontevedra (since 1996); Minister of Development of Spain (2011–2016); Coordinator of Participation and Sectorial Action of the PP (2008–2012); Second Vice President of the Congress of Deputies (2008–2011); Executive Secretary of Social Policy and Welfare of the PP (2004–2008); Minister of Health and Consumer Affairs (2002–2004); Undersecretary of Interior of Spain (2001–2002); Undersecretary of the Presidency of Spain (2000–2001); Undersecretary of Education and Culture of Spain (1999–2000).
Mariano Rajoy (age ) — Prime Minister of Spain (2011–2018); President of the PP (2004–2018); Deputy in the Cortes Generales for Pontevedra and Madrid (1986 and 1989–2018); Leader of the Opposition of Spain (2004–2011); Secretary-General of the PP (2003–2004); Spokesperson of the Government of Spain (2002–2003); Minister of the Presidency of Spain (2000–2001 and 2002–2003); First Deputy Prime Minister of Spain (2000–2003); Vice Secretary-General of the PP (1990–2003); Minister of the Interior of Spain (2001–2002); Minister of Education and Culture of Spain (1999–2000); Minister of Public Administrations of Spain (1996–1999); President of AP/PP in Pontevedra (1983–1986 and 1987–1991); Vice President of the Xunta de Galicia (1986–1987); President of the Provincial Deputation of Pontevedra (1983–1986); City Councillor of Pontevedra (1983–1986); Deputy in the Parliament of Galicia for Pontevedra (1981–1985); Director-General of Institutional Relations of Galicia (1982); Vice Secretary of the Parliament of Galicia (1981–1982).

Endorsements

Total
Candidates seeking to run were required to collect the endorsements of at least 100 party members.

Public endorsements

Pablo Casado

Elio Cabanes

María Dolores de Cospedal

José Ramón García-Hernández

José Manuel García-Margallo

Soraya Sáenz de Santamaría

Opinion polls
Poll results are listed in the tables below in reverse chronological order, showing the most recent first, and using the date the survey's fieldwork was done, as opposed to the date of publication. If such date is unknown, the date of publication is given instead. The highest percentage figure in each polling survey is displayed in bold, and the background shaded in the candidate's colour. In the instance of a tie, the figures with the highest percentages are shaded. Polls show data gathered among PP voters/supporters as well as Spanish voters as a whole, but not among party members, who are the ones ultimately entitled to vote in the primary election.

PP voters

Spanish voters

Delegate estimations

Results

Overall

By region

By province

Notes

References
Opinion poll sources

Other

July 2018 events in Spain
Political party leadership elections in Spain
PP leadership election